Pyotr Fadeyevich Lomako (12 July 1904 – 27 May 1990) was a Soviet politician and economist, head of Gosplan between 1962 and 1965. During the Second World War, he was responsible for overseeing the evacuation of Soviet industry to the Ural mountains region. He was a seven-time recipient of the Order of Lenin, and also received the golden medal of the Hero of Socialist Labor.

Early life

Pyotr Lomako was born to a family of peasant laborers on 12 July 1904 (O.S.: 29 June) in Temryuk, Krasnodar. He studied for three years at the Plekhanov Institute of the National Economy before graduating in 1932 from the Moscow Institute of Nonferrous Metals and Gold. Between 1932 and 1939 he worked as an industrial manager: as a foreman, master, chief of shop, and then assistant to the chief engineer of a factory in Leningrad, and then from 1937 as director of a nonferrous metals factory in the Ivanovo region.

Political career

Lomako joined the Communist Party in 1925. In 1939 he was made an assistant to the People's Commissar (Narkom) for Nonferrous Metallurgy, and in 1940 he was promoted to the post of Narkom. Lomako was a Deputy of the Supreme Soviet of the USSR, being elected in the 2nd and the 4th through 8th elections to the body, serving between 1946 and 1950 and 1954 to 1989.

Second World War

As an industrial Narkom, Lomako played an important role in maintaining Soviet industry after the outbreak of war in 1941. In particular, he was responsible for managing the mass evacuation of Soviet industry to the Ural mountains region.

Post-War

Following the Second World War, Lomako remained Narkom and subsequently Minister for Nonferrous Metallurgy until 1948. Between 1948 and 1950, he served as Deputy Minister for the Iron and Steel Industry. He was returned to original portfolio as a Minister in 1950, and then made Deputy Minister for Iron and Steel once again in 1951, before serving for a third time as Minister for Nonferrous Metallurgy between 1954 and 1957.

In 1957 Lomako left Sovmin, becoming Chairman of the Krasnoyarsk People's Economic Council (Sovnarkhoz), a position he held until 1961.

Party career

Lomako was a candidate member of the Central Committee of the CPSU at the 19th and 20th Congresses of the CPSU. At the 22nd Congress of the CPSU in 1961, he was elected as a member, and became Vice-President of the RSFSR Bureau of the Committee, where he served until 1962.

Lomako was deselected from the Central Committee at the 25th Party Congress in 1976.

Chairman of Gosplan

Pyotr Lomako was selected to succeed Veniamin Dymshits as Chairman of Gosplan, the State Planning Committee, on 24 November 1962. Lomako oversaw the transitional period between Nikita Khrushchev and Leonid Brezhnev, and was therefore responsible for coordinating the Soviet economy at a time of economic uncertainty. As Lomako was also Deputy Chairman of Sovmin during this period, he fell under the direct influence of Alexei Kosygin, the reformist Premier.

Lomako was responsible for coordinating a reformist economic policy, and is argued by contemporary Western analysts such as G. W. Simmonds to have been removed by Brezhnev in 1965 as part of a bid to weaken Kosygin's power and reintroduce economic conservatism.

After his removal from Gosplan, Lomako served as Minister for Non-Ferrous Metallurgy until 1985. He died in 1990 at the age of 85.

Notes and references

Sources
 (in Russian) "Lomako, Pyotr Fadeyevich" in the Great Soviet Encyclopedia, 3rd edition, Moscow 1972.
 (in Russian) Biography at Khronos, accessed 7 July 2009

1904 births
1990 deaths
People from Temryuksky District
People from Kuban Oblast
Soviet politicians
People's commissars and ministers of the Soviet Union
Communist Party of the Soviet Union members
Soviet economists
Plekhanov Russian University of Economics alumni